All Saints' Church, Denstone is a Grade II* listed parish church in the Church of England in Denstone.

History
The church was built between 1860 and 1862 to designs of the architect George Edmund Street, funded by Sir Thomas Percival Heywood, 2nd Baronet. At the same time, Street also designed the lychgate, churchyard cross, vicarage and village school.

Fittings
The font on four marble columns is by Street, with carvings of four angels on each corner holding reversed jars to symbolise the four Rivers of Paradise by Thomas Earp.

The pulpit, chandeliers and wrought-iron screen are also by Street. There is stained glass by Clayton and Bell.

Organ
The church has an organ which originally was built by Nicholson & Son in 1868 with the organ case by G. E. Street. A specification of the organ can be found on the National Pipe Organ Register.

Churchyard
The churchyard contains the war grave of a Colonel Bertram of the Manchester Regiment of World War I.

See also
Grade II* listed buildings in East Staffordshire
Listed buildings in Denstone

References

Church of England church buildings in Staffordshire
Grade II* listed churches in Staffordshire
Churches completed in 1862
1862 establishments in England